Ceratoclasis cyclostigma is a moth in the family Crambidae. It was described by Harrison Gray Dyar Jr. in 1914. It is found in Panama.

The wingspan is about 20 mm. The forewings are blackish brown, with a slight bronze tinge and dark lines. Adults have been recorded on wing in May and August.

References

Moths described in 1914
Spilomelinae